The Play-offs of the 2010 Fed Cup Europe/Africa Zone Group II were the final stages of the Group I Zonal Competition involving teams from Europe and Africa. Using the positions determined in their pools, the sixteen teams faced off to determine their placing in the 2005 Fed Cup Europe/Africa Zone Group II. The top two teams advanced to Group I, and the bottom two teams were relegated down to the Group III for the next year.

Promotion play-offs
The top two teams of each pool were placed against each other in two head-to-head rounds. The winner of the rounds advanced to Group I for next year.

Greece vs. Georgia

Luxembourg vs. Finland

Relegation play-offs
The last placed teams of each pool were placed against each other in two ties. The losing team of the rounds were relegated to Group III for next year.

South Africa vs. Armenia

Liechtenstein vs. Norway

Final Placements

  and  advanced to the Europe/Africa Zone Group I for the next year. The Greeks placed fourth in  their pool, but won their relegation play-off, meaning they remained in Group I for 2012. The Luxembourgians, however, placed third in their pool, and ended up placing eleventh overall.
The South Africans placed first in their pool, and won their promotional play-off, meaning they advanced to Group I for 2012. The Norwegians, however, placed third in their pool and ended up placing fifth overall.

See also
Fed Cup structure

References

External links
 Fed Cup website

2010 Fed Cup Europe/Africa Zone